Kreuzstetten is a town in the district of Mistelbach in the Austrian state of Lower Austria.

Population

Notable people
 Anna Kiesenhofer, Austrian cyclist, Olympic champion

References

Cities and towns in Mistelbach District